Robert Libman (born November 8, 1960) is a Canadian politician and architect.

Background

Born in Montreal, Quebec, he is the son of David Libman and Goldie Aronovitch. He attended Herzliah High School, Vanier College, and received a Bachelor of architecture from McGill University in 1985. From 1985 to 1989, he practiced architecture with Jacques Beique et Associés and Tolchinsky and Goodz Architects.

Provincial politics

In 1988, he co-founded the Equality Party to protest against the Quebec Liberal Party government's decision to extend a ban on English commercial signs. In 1989, he was elected as a Member of the National Assembly in the Montreal riding of D'Arcy-McGee, winning 57.85% of the valid ballots.

Due in part to the surprise victory of the Equality Party, the Quebec government later lessened restrictions on English signs.  During his term in office, Libman made headlines by using his Parliamentary privilege to reveal the details of confidential, money-losing contracts signed between Hydro-Québec and some of Quebec's aluminum producers.

Libman left the Equality Party and sat as an independent shortly before the 1994 general election.  His supporters attempted to make him the Quebec Liberal Party candidate in his riding. However, new Quebec Liberal Party leader Daniel Johnson refused to sign his nomination papers. Libman ran as an independent and lost to the Quebec Liberal Party candidate Lawrence Bergman.

After his election defeat, he hosted an evening talk show on Montreal radio station CJAD for three years. He also became the Quebec Regional Director of B'nai Brith Canada.

In 1997 Libman won a unanimous Supreme Court of Canada judgement in Libman v Quebec (AG). Certain sections of the Quebec Referendum Law, concerning restrictions on third party spending, were struck down.  As a result of this decision, the charges against federalist groups who participated in the large Pro-Canada Rally during the 1995 referendum campaign were cancelled.

In 1995 Libman authored Riding the Rapids; The Whitewater Rise and Fall of Quebec's Anglo Protest published by Robert Davies Publishing.

Mayor of Côte Saint-Luc

In 1998, Libman was acclaimed mayor of the city of Côte Saint-Luc, Quebec. In 2001, he was elected borough mayor of Côte Saint-Luc—Hampstead—Montreal West and was a member of the Montreal City Council and its Executive Committee. He was responsible for the Urban Planning and Development portfolio and was charged with overseeing the creation of Montreal's new Urban Master Plan which was adopted by City Council in 2004.

Libman supported the continued merger of the borough of Côte Saint-Luc with the megacity of Montreal after the provincial government watered down their promise of allowing the former cities to return to the same status as they had before the merger.

He decided to quit politics in 2005, and not to run for mayor of the re-constituted city of Côte Saint-Luc following its demerger from the megacity of Montreal. He returned to private life and opened his own architectural consulting firm, Libcorp Consultants Inc. He was also a director and partner in RSW Properties, a property management firm in Montreal until 2015. Later that year he joined Olymbec, a large real estate developer as their in-house consultant on architecture, planning and municipal zoning.

Move to federal politics
Libman returned to politics in 2014 by seeking the Conservative Party of Canada nomination in Mount Royal for the 2015 federal election. Libman won the nomination on April 26, beating former TVA journalist, Pascale Déry. On October 19, 2015, Libman was defeated by Liberal Anthony Housefather.

In January 2021 Libman was named by the Montreal Gazette as a weekly political affairs columnist for the Saturday edition.

Electoral history

See also
 List of third party leaders (Quebec)
 History of Quebec

Footnotes

External links

1960 births
Living people
Architects from Montreal
Equality Party (Quebec) MNAs
Mayors of places in Quebec
Montreal city councillors
McGill School of Architecture alumni
Anglophone Quebec people
Quebec political party leaders
People from Côte Saint-Luc
Canadian architects
Conservative Party of Canada candidates for the Canadian House of Commons
Jewish mayors of places in Canada
Quebec candidates for Member of Parliament